Muhedin Targaj (born 19 March 1955) is a retired Albanian football player and manager. He now works at Albanian Football Association as a member of Executive Committee.

Club career
Born in Tepelenë, Targaj played for Dinamo Tirana from 1973 to 1987, winning five Albanian Superliga championships.

International career
Targaj made 22 appearances for the Albania national football team from 1980 to 1985. He made his international debut on 3 September 1980 against Finland for the qualifying stage of the 1982 FIFA World Cup, playing full-90 minutes in the 2–0 home win. He captained his side for the first time on 27 October 1982 during the 1–0 away lose to Turkey for the UEFA Euro 1984 qualifying.

International goals
Scores and results list Albania's goal tally first.

Managerial career
Following his playing career, Targaj was the Technical Director of Dinamo Tirana from 2001 to 2005. During this time, he was also the coach of the club during the 2001–02 season.

Managerial statistics

Honours

Club
Dinamo Tirana
Albanian Superliga (5): 1974–75, 1975–76, 1976–77, 1979–80, 1985–86
Albanian Cup (3): 1973–74, 1977–78

References

External links

1955 births
Living people
People from Tepelenë
Association football central defenders
Albanian footballers
Albania international footballers
FK Dinamo Tirana players